Collpa Janca (possibly from Quechua qullpa salty, saltpeter, hanka snowcapped ridge or peak; ice, "salty ridge") is a mountain in the northern part of the Cordillera Blanca in the Andes of Peru which reaches a height of approximately . It is located in the Ancash Region, Corongo Province, Cusca District, and in the Huaylas Province, Yuracmarca District. Collpa Janca lies northeast of Champará.

References

Mountains of Peru
Mountains of Ancash Region